Operation Underground Railroad (O.U.R.) is a United States-based nonprofit organization which is involved in the rescue of human trafficking and sex trafficking victims, with a special focus on children, and a wider goal of eliminating sex trafficking world-wide. The group was founded in 2013 in Salt Lake City, Utah, by Tim Ballard, allegedly a former officer of the U.S. Department of Homeland Security. 

As of April 2020, O.U.R. claimed that they had been involved in the rescue of 3,000 victims and the arrests of 182 traffickers, but these figures are highly disputed.

In 2020, Ballard and O.U.R. were the subjects of several media investigations that detailed Ballard's relationships with corrupt foreign government officials, his history of fabricating rescues and statistics. In October of that year, the Attorney's Office of Davis County, Utah, announced the O.U.R. and Ballard were under criminal investigation.

History
Tim Ballard claims that prior to founding O.U.R., he served 12 years as a U.S. Special Agent for the Department of Homeland Security, on the Internet Crimes against Children Task Force and the U.S. Child Sex Tourism Jump Team. The Atlantic writer Kaitlyn Tiffany wrote in her article about O.U.R., "Spokespeople for the CIA and DHS said they could not confirm Ballard's employment record without his written permission, which he did not provide." According to Ballard, he was frustrated with the lack of strategies employed to rescue kidnapped and trafficked children in underdeveloped nations, and the inability to prosecute offenders in non-U.S. related cases. Subsequently, he left the government in October 2013 to found Operation Underground Railroad. The organization was founded in Salt Lake City, Utah, but they also have offices in Southern California. 

To help raise awareness and support, film producer Gerald R. Molen approached Ballard to document preparation and activity relating to a few covert operations for a feature film. The documentary, titled The Abolitionists, was released in early 2016.

Operations
According to the organization, O.U.R. works with supporting governments and organizations in one or more of the following activities: prevention, discovery, preparation, rescue, victim recovery programs, and fundraising efforts. Their team members are of former military and law enforcement officials including Matt Osborne, Carlos Maza, Francisco Vega, Dean Morgan, and Dodd Dupree as well as other support volunteers. Operations are segments of any coordinated effort, training and/or direct involvement to rescue trafficking victims. O.U.R. states it does not work independently, or without government participation and support. A documentary called Operation Toussaint was created in 2018 featuring the operations of O.U.R. in Haiti.

International operations 
In April 2022, O.U.R. participated in an anti-trafficking summit in Cartagena, Colombia. The same year, O.U.R. also provided investigative and undercover support in the arrests of Nelson Maatman, Marthijn Uittenbogaard (both expatriated, self-describing activist Dutch pedophiles in Mexico and Ecuador respectively), and Uittenbogaard's adult male partner. Maatman's Lawyer has since complained of his client's mistreatment in jail, while the Dutch Journalist, Anton Dautzenberg (a long-term contact of Uittenbogaard) claims Uittenbogaard is not guilty of the accusations, and that Ballard has intimidated child witnesses and engaged in corruption. In a February 2023 opinion published for Het Parool, Arnon Grunberg has criticized what he sees as suspect financial ties between O.U.R., their strategic partner in the Maatman/Uittenbogaard operations (the Dutch Free A Girl Foundation) and the Dutch Government, calling for dispassionate investigation of the matter.

In August 2022, O.U.R. supported an operation in the Dominican Republic involving raids, the arrest of 14 suspects, and over 200 law enforcement agents.

Law enforcement support 
O.U.R. bought over 50 dogs trained to detect electronic storage devices from Jordan Detection K9 and donated them to police departments in several U.S. States and Thailand.

Aftercare
According to O.U.R., and publicity surrounding O.U.R. awareness-raising campaigns, the company runs an aftercare program, providing medical and psychological services, education, and vocational opportunities to survivors. In January 2022, O.U.R. stated that in 2021 it provided aftercare in 30 countries. In February 2020, O.U.R. paid for the trip to Italy, where her birth family now lives, of an American woman who says she was stolen as a baby from her parents, who were poor farmers in Romania, and raised by adoptive parents in Wisconsin.

According to Foreign Policy, in 2014, "after OUR’s first operation in the Dominican Republic, a local organization called the National Council for Children and Adolescents (CONANI when abbreviated in Spanish) quickly discovered it didn’t have the capacity to handle the 26 girls rescued. They were released in less than a week." In 2021 and 2022, Damion Moore of American Crime Journal presented evidence alleging that former partners of O.U.R. had parted ways with the organization, citing among their concerns, O.U.R.'s dereliction of aftercare responsibilities.

Criticism and investigations
The supporters of O.U.R. have been criticized for promoting the far-right conspiracy theory QAnon, while Ballard has been accused of using social media to fake a commercial partnership with American Airlines.

A 2020 Vice News investigation found a divide between the organization's actual practices and some of its claimed successes. For instance, O.U.R. claimed that it rescued a woman named "Liliana", who according to a court testimony of Timothy Ballard escaped by herself. A 2021 follow-up article further criticized O.U.R.'s practices, including using inexperienced donors and celebrities as part of its jump team, a lack of meaningful surveillance or identification of targets, failing to validate whether the people they intended to rescue were in fact actual trafficking victims, and conflating consensual sex work with sex trafficking.

In August 2020, Lynn Packer of American Crime Journal reported that criminal complaints had been forwarded to the Davis County District Attorney at their office in Farmington, Utah. He alleged that he had spent the last five years investigating Tim Ballard and Operation Underground Railroad. Packer was later interviewed by American psychologist John Dehlin on his Mormon Stories Podcast. Dehlin, who like Packer is an excommunicated member of the Church of Jesus Christ of Latter-day Saints (LDS Church), asked why such a major "development for the state of Utah and the LDS Church" was not released or "being pursued" by mainstream Utah press. Packer asserted that Utah media and the LDS Church were complicit in legitimizing Operation Underground Railroad with little to no oversight and fact-checking. In October 2020, the Attorney's Office of Davis County, Utah stated that O.U.R. and Ballard were under investigation regarding complaints that O.U.R. had conducted illegal fundraising efforts by fabricating rescues that never took place.

References

Organizations that combat human trafficking
Organizations established in 2013
Organizations based in Utah
Non-profit organizations based in Utah
Non-profit organizations based in California